Vehbi Kıpçak (1875; Servi (Sevlievo) - June 14, 1946; İstanbul) was an officer of the Ottoman Army and a general of the Turkish Army.

See also
List of high-ranking commanders of the Turkish War of Independence

Sources

1875 births
People from Sevlievo
Ottoman Military Academy alumni
Ottoman Military College alumni
Ottoman Army officers
Ottoman military personnel of the Balkan Wars
Ottoman military personnel of World War I
Turkish military personnel of the Turkish War of Independence
Turkish military personnel of the Greco-Turkish War (1919–1922)
Turkish Army generals
Recipients of the Liakat Medal
Recipients of the Medal of Independence with Red Ribbon (Turkey)
1946 deaths